The Library is on Fire is an American indie rock band formed by singer/guitarist Steve Five in 2007. Their sound has been described as art punk.  The band originally began from a manifesto of the same name written by Five. Five took the name from a poem by French war poet René Char while working at Strand Bookstore, after weekly meetings over coffee with Television guitarist Tom Verlaine.  The band headlined their first New York show at Glasslands Gallery in 2008, with future Grammy nominees The Ting Tings opening.

In March 2010, The Library is On Fire released Magic Windows, Magic Nights on Fill in the Blank Records. The album was produced by Todd Tobias, who has worked extensively with Guided by Voices and Robert Pollard. The album features a cameo appearance from Derek Stanton of Awesome Color on lead guitar.  In 2010, The Library is On Fire was featured in a video series, Masters From Their Day, produced by Benchmark Media. The band also recorded a cover of Peter Gabriel’s “Digging in the Dirt” for Jagjaguwar/Brah Records’ digital singles series.

Discography 

Cassette (2008), self-released
Blue Rider & The Looking Glass Fern (2009), Fill in The Blank Records
Missed Connections (2010), Fill in The Blank Records
Magic Windows, Magic Nights (2010), Fill in The Blank Records
Exposé (2011), self-released
Works On Paper (2011), self-released
Halcyon & Surrounding Areas (2014), self-released

References

External links
Official Myspace
Todd Tobias Wikipedia
Fill in The Blank Records
New York Post Interview
Village Voice Interview
Sentimentalist Magazine Interview
Hype Machine (Indie Rock Café)
Indie Surfer Blog
[ Magic Windows, Magic Nights on All Music Guide]

Indie rock musical groups from New York (state)
Musical groups established in 2007
Musical groups from Brooklyn